Bhairab Ganguli (1 August 1931 – 30 July 2014) was an Indian cricket umpire. He stood in five Test matches between 1982 and 1985, two ODI games between 1982 and 1984, and 29 first-class matches between 1971 and 1986.

See also
 List of Test cricket umpires
 List of One Day International cricket umpires

References

1931 births
2014 deaths
People from Dhaka
Indian Test cricket umpires
Indian One Day International cricket umpires